Frederick Charles Erentz (March 1870 – 6 April 1938) was a Scottish footballer who played at half-back and full-back for Dundee Our Boys and Newton Heath in the 1880s, 1890s and early 1900s.

Early life 
Born in Broughty Ferry, near Dundee, to a Danish father, Erentz began his football career with Dundee Our Boys. Originally a half-back, Erentz was signed by Newton Heath in June 1892 in preparation for their first season in The Football League. He made his Newton Heath debut on 3 September 1892, playing at left half in a 4–3 defeat by Blackburn Rovers. Erentz was almost an ever-present during the 1892–93 season, missing only an away match against Derby County on 11 February 1893.

Career 
The following season, Erentz was deployed in several different positions, including right half and both right forward positions, from where he scored his first goal for the club, but he made most of his appearances in 1893–94 at left-back. Erentz was effectively ever-present at left-back over his next eight seasons at the club, and even rejected a sizeable contract offer from Tottenham Hotspur, where his brother Harry played at right-back.

Erentz retired from football at the end of the 1901–02 season as a result of a knee injury. His final appearance for the club was also the last match the club played as Newton Heath before becoming Manchester United, a 2–1 win over Manchester City in the final of the Manchester Senior Cup on 26 April 1902.

References
General

Specific

External links
Profile at StretfordEnd.co.uk
Profile at MUFCInfo.com

1870 births
1938 deaths
Footballers from Dundee
Scottish people of Danish descent
Scottish footballers
Association football fullbacks
Dundee F.C. players
Manchester United F.C. players
English Football League players
People from Broughty Ferry